Liège Basket is a Belgian professional basketball club from Liège. The club competes in the BNXT League. Founded in 1967, the team plays at 5,600 seat Country Hall Ethias Liège.

The club is one of the traditional clubs in Belgian basketball, having played in the top flight division since 2001. Liège Basket's accolades include one Belgian Cup (in 2004) and two Belgian Supercups (in 2004 and 2009).

History
The club was founded in Fléron as the Fléron Basket Club in 1967. After being an amateur league for its first years, the team hired its first professional coach in 1975. In 1977 and 1981, the Fléron promoted to the first regional league. In 1983, the club made its debut on the national level as it promoted to the Fourth National Division. In 2000, the club decided to merge with BC Hannut and Essor Hannut, relocating to the city of Liège.

After the move to Lìege, the club quickly promoted to the First National League. In 2001, the club's debut in Europe was made after it qualified as 7th in the previous season. In the 2001–02 FIBA Korać Cup, the team lost to French side Racing Paris in the first round. Three years later, in 2004, the team wins its first silverware when it captures the Belgian Basketball Cup for the first time.

In the 2008–09 season, the team had its best European campaign when it reached the Top 16 of the 2008–09 FIBA EuroChallenge. In 2010, Liège played in the championship playoffs for the first time, but loses to Spirou Charleroi.

Since the 2021–22 season, Liège plays in the BNXT League, in which the national leagues of Belgium and the Netherlands have been merged. After the 2020s were characterised mainly by financial problems for Liège, the club was purchased by an American investors group in 2022. The Mickael Sports Group, owned by Ernie Cambo, purchased all shares in the team. Following the acquisition, head coach Lionel Bosco was sacked and replaced by Brad Greenberg.

Honours and titles
Belgian Cup
Winners (1): 2003–04 

Belgian Supercup
Winners (2): 2004, 2009

Logos and names

Current roster

Season by season

European record

Players

Individual awards

Notable players

References

External links
Official site

Basketball teams in Belgium
Sport in Liège
Basketball teams established in 1967
Pro Basketball League